Alla Borisovna Pugacheva (born 15 April 1949), is а Soviet and Russian musical performer. Her career started in 1965 and continues to this day, even though she has retired from performing. For her "clear mezzo-soprano and a full display of sincere emotions", she enjoys an iconic status across the former Soviet Union as the most successful Soviet performer in terms of record sales and popularity.

Pugacheva's repertoire includes over 500 songs in Russian, English, German, French, Kazakh, Hebrew, Finnish, Ukrainian, and her discography has more than 100 records, CDs and DVDs. In addition to Russia and the former Soviet Union, Pugacheva's albums were released in Japan, Korea, Sweden, Finland, Germany, Poland, Czechoslovakia and Bulgaria. In total, Pugacheva has sold more than 250 million records.

She became a People's Artist of the USSR in 1991, a Laureate of the State Prize of the Russian Federation in 1995, and was decorated as a Chevalier of the Order "For Merit to the Fatherland" II, III and IV degrees. She represented Russia in the Eurovision Song Contest 1997 with the song "Primadonna", finishing in 15th place.

Early life and education

Pugacheva was born to Boris Mikhailovich Pugachëv and Zinaida Arkhipovna (born Odegova) Pugachëva in Moscow, on 15 April 1949. In 1956, she enrolled in music school No.31, and attended the Ippolitov-Ivanov music college. She went on to study at school No.496, finishing her studies there in 1964. She then studied in the choral-conducting department of the college. Pugacheva recorded her first track "Robot" in 1965, for a morning programme on Radio Yunost.

Career

Pugacheva finished college in 1966 and subsequently toured with the group Yunost' (Youth) in western Siberia. The following year she began working as a piano accompanist at the State Circus Musical college. She provided the leading vocals to a number of bands, including Novy Elektron (New Electron), part of the Lipetsk State Philharmonic Society, in 1966, Moskvichi (Muscovites) in 1971, Oleg Lundstrem's band in 1972–73, and Vesyolye Rebyata (Merry Folks) in 1974–75. She recorded songs throughout that period for numerous movies.

In 1974, she came in 3rd place in the All-Union competition of musicians. In 1975, she received the Grand Prix of the Golden Orpheus international singing contest in Bulgaria, performing the song "Harlequin" by Emil Dimitrov. The Amiga label released her winning song as a single in East Germany. Subsequently, in Bulgaria, the Balkanton label released the live recording of "Harlequin" from the festival as a single. A year later, Pugacheva returned to the Golden Orpheus to perform a concert outside the competition. The Balkanton released the live tracks as Pugacheva's first album Zolotoy Orfey 76. In that same year, Pugacheva recorded a number of songs for the musical drama-comedy The Irony of Fate as the singing voice of Nadja, the female protagonist.

The Woman Who Sings, 1977

Pugacheva went on to work on the musical film The Woman who Sings in cooperation with the band Ritm (Rhythm) in 1977. She played the leading lady, a famous pop singer who sacrifices her personal life for her career. The soundtrack, which was co-written by Pugacheva and composed of pop songs, culminated with the dramatic title ballad "Zhenshchina, kotoraya poyot". The Soviet audience, regarding the film as autobiographical, brought the soundtrack to reach record audience of the year in 1979, as it was bought by 55 million people. The soundtrack was first released in 1977 as part of the double album Zerkalo dushi (Mirror of the Soul), which was a collection of her songs from 1975 to 1977. The Victor label released a collection album Alla Pugacheva in the same year in Japan. In 1978, performing the song "Vsyo mogut koroli" ("Kings Can Do Anything"), Pugacheva received the Amber Nightingale prize at the Sopot International Song Festival which at the time meant automatically winning the Grand Prix of the Intervision Song Contest. In 1980, the Kansan label of Finland released her above-listed works as the compilation album Huipulla (At the Top). Tonbandausnahmenkompanie Bayer GmbH did the same in West Germany, releasing Alla Pugachova.

Stockholm, 1980–2000
During the 1980s, Pugacheva was a frequent visitor to Stockholm. She started out with multiple guest appearances on the popular Swedish radio show Galaxen (April 1980 year) conducted by Jacob Dahlin, and later frequently appeared on his TV show Jacobs Stege (Jacob's Ladder). Dahlin and Pugacheva used to perform duets, such as "Superman" where Dahlin sings as the title character. In Stockholm, Pugacheva recorded an album in English, released by the World Record Music label in Sweden as Watch Out and by the Melodiya label in the Soviet Union as Alla Pugacheva in Stockholm.

Pugacheva had sold a quarter of a billion records by 2000.

Private life

In 1969, she married Lithuanian circus performer , and on May 25, 1971 she gave birth to a daughter, Kristina Orbakaitė, who is also a popular singer. Pugacheva divorced Orbakas after four years of marriage in 1973. She married film director Alexander Stefanovich (1945–2021) in 1976 and starred in several of his movies. The union was dissolved in 1980.

In 1985, Pugacheva married producer Yevgeniy Boldin, with whom she had numerous professional collaborations. She had a working and romantic relationship with a young musician and singer, Vladimir Kuzmin during this period. In 1993, she divorced Yevgeniy Boldin stating that their professional lives interfered too much with their personal life.

In 1994, she married a pop singer, Philipp Kirkorov. Their divorce was announced in November 2005.

On 23 December 2011, Pugacheva married satirist Maxim Galkin, who is 27 years younger. The couple has twins delivered by a surrogate mother.

Commentary on war in Ukraine 
In March 2014, Pugacheva signed a petition against the persecution of Andrei Makarevich, who protested against the annexation of Crimea and war in Donbas.

In March 2022, Pugacheva and Galkin left Russia for Israel following the 2022 Russian invasion of Ukraine. In August 2022, Pugacheva returned to Russia, saying "she would clean up the mess in my head, in people heads". In September 2022, after her husband had been declared a "foreign agent", she spoke out publicly condemning the war and useless deaths of Russian men who are forced to die for illusory reasons. She also demanded Ministry of Justice to declare her a foreign agent, too. Russian authorities began investigating Pugacheva for "discrediting" the Russian military under Russian 2022 war censorship laws. In October 2022, Pugacheva revealed that she had left Russia again for Israel.

Honours and awards

Pugacheva's most notable title is "People's Artist of the USSR", the highest honor that could be bestowed to a musical artist in the state, awarded to her in 1991. While the lesser titles of "Accomplished Artist of the Russian SFSR", and "People's Artist of the Russian SFSR" had been already awarded to her in 1980 and 1985 respectively, the government was hesitant to award her its highest honor, reportedly largely because of statements and actions on her part that were inconsistent with the Party's agenda. Pugacheva is listed in the Russian Encyclopedia (2005).

On 15 April 2009, her 60th birthday President of Russia Dmitry Medvedev awarded Pugacheva the 3rd Degree Order of Merit for the Fatherland.

She was honored as one of the BBC 100 Women in December 2022.
Orders
 Order "For Merit to the Fatherland", 2nd class (15 April 1999)
 Order "For Merit to the Fatherland", 3rd class (15 April 2009)
 Order "For Merit to the Fatherland", 4th class (17 April 2014)
 Order of St. Mesrop Mashtots (Armenia, 26 September 2009)
 Dostlug Order (Azerbaijan, 4 September 2009)

Titles
People's Artist of the USSR (20 December 1991)
People's Artist of the RSFSR (1985)
Honored Artist of the RSFSR (1980)
Honorary citizen of the city of Makhachkala (2006)

Awards
State Prize of the Russian Federation (7 June 1995) – For outstanding contribution to the development of literature and art
Belarus president award Through Art – to Peace and Understanding (7 July 2006)

|-
! colspan="3" style="background: red;" | Ovation
|-

|-

Discography

Famous songs
«Две звезды» (Two stars) 
«Я тебя поцеловала» (I kissed you) 
«Миллионы алых роз» (Millions of scarlet Roses) 
«Папа купил автомобиль» (Dad bought a car) 
«Мадам Брошкина» (Madame Broshkina) 
«Осенний поцелуй» (Autumn Kiss) 
«Осторожно листопад» (Careful leaf fall) 
«Песенка про себя (Также как все)» (A song about myself (Just like everyone else)) 
«На Тихорецкую состав отправится» (The train will go to Tikhoretskaya) 
«100 друзей» (100 friends) 
«Айсберг» (Iceberg) 
«Волшебник-недоучка» (The half-educated Wizard)
«Всё могут короли» (Kings can do anything)

Original solo albums

* Official English title.

Other albums

1978 Alla Pugacheva (released in Japan) – compilation
1978 Ala Pugachova. Ogledalo na dushata (released in Bulgaria) – compilation
1979 Alla Pugacheva i Iosif Kobzon – split
1980 Diskoteka A – instrumental remixes
1980 Alla Pugatšova. Huipulla (Alla Pugacheva. At the Top; Kansan, Finland)
1980 Alla Pugačevova. Zrcadlo duše (Czech version of Zerkalo dushi)
1981 Alla Pugačova (Czech version of To li eshche budet...)
1981 Alla Pugatšova. Tähtikesä (Alla Pugacheva. Starry summer; Kansan, Finland)
1982 U nas v gostjakh maestro (Our Guest is the Maestro) – live / split
1982 Parad Planet – split
1983 Million Roz (released in Japan) – compilation
1983 Alla Pugačova. Dávná píseň (a Czech compilation)
1984 Alla Pugacheva – Soviet Superstar. Greatest Hits 1976–84 (World Record Music, Sweden) – compilation
1985 Alla Pugacheva – Soviet Superstar vol.2 (released by the World Record Music in Finland) – compilation
1988 Pesni vmesto pisem (Songs Instead Of Letters) – split with Udo Lindenberg
1989 Paromshik – (Ferryman) (Finnish release of Rechnoy paromshchik)
1991 Alla (Ritonis, Riga)
1994 Veryu v tebya (I Believe in You) – compilation
1995 Put' zvezdy (The Path of a Star) – compilation
1996 A 13 CD compilation of songs previously released only on LP and MC
1996 Poët Alla Pugacheva (Alla Pugacheva Sings; songs by Aleksandr Zazepin) – compilation
1997 Dve zvezdy (Two Stars; with Vladimir Kuzmin) – compilation / split
1998 Syurpriz ot Ally Pugachevy (Surprise from Alla Pugacheva) – tribute

CD singles
1997 Primadonna (Eurovision 1997)
2000 Bely sneg (White Snow)
2000 Madam Broshkina
2002 Eto lyubov (It's Love)

There is an unknown number of single and EP releases published all over the world.

Films and TV appearances
1978 Teatr Ally Pugachevoy, Estonian Television
1978 The Woman who Sings, Mosfilm
1981 Lyubovyu za lyubov''' (Love For Love) Mosfilm
1984 Vstrechi s Alloy Pugachevoy (Meetings with Alla Pugacheva), USSR TV
1985 Prishla i govoryu (I Came and I'm Speaking), Mosfilm
1985 Sezon chudes (Season of Miracles), Odessa Film Studio
1989–2002 Rozhdestvenskie vstrechi (Christmas Meetings), USSR TV, Ostankino, Public Russian Television, Russian State Television
1995 Zhdi i pomni menya (Wait for Me, Remember Me), Public Russian Television
1997 Laat de Leeuw (Late de Leeuw), VARA
2003 Za dvumya zaytsami (Chasing Two Rabbits'')

See also
Russian pop music
Best selling music artists – World's top-selling music artists chart.

Notes

References

External links

Russian Music on the net: Info on Alla Pugacheva with lyrics translated to English

Alla Pugacheva at the Forbes 
Videos of Alla Pugacheva's Concert in Kremlin
 

1949 births
Living people
Actresses from Moscow
Eurovision Song Contest entrants of 1997
Members of the Civic Chamber of the Russian Federation
Recipients of the Order "For Merit to the Fatherland", 2nd class
Recipients of the Order "For Merit to the Fatherland", 3rd class
Recipients of the Order "For Merit to the Fatherland", 4th class
People's Artists of the USSR
People's Artists of the RSFSR
Honored Artists of the RSFSR
State Prize of the Russian Federation laureates
Eurovision Song Contest entrants for Russia
Russian composers
Russian pop singers
Russian Orthodox Christians from Russia
Singers from Moscow
Sopot International Song Festival winners
Soviet actresses
Soviet women singers
Soviet pop singers
Civic Platform (Russia) politicians
Russian pop musicians
Soviet women composers
Russian women composers
Soviet television presenters
Russian television presenters
20th-century Russian singers
21st-century Russian singers
20th-century Russian women singers
21st-century Russian women singers
Fabrika Zvyozd
Russian women television presenters
20th-century women composers
Russian emigrants to Cyprus
Naturalized citizens of Cyprus
Winners of the Golden Gramophone Award
Russian activists against the 2022 Russian invasion of Ukraine
Russian emigrants to Israel
 
BBC 100 Women